Greater Art is the first studio album by the Swedish metal band Lake of Tears. It was released in 1994 with a straightforward doom metal and death metal sound.

Track listing

Personnel
 Daniel Brennare - vocals, lead guitar
 Mikael Larsson - bass
 Johan Oudhuis - drums

Additional personnel
 Tomas Skogsberg - production, mixing, keyboards, guitar solo on "Greater Art"
 Mathias Lodmalm - production, mixing, guitar solo on "Greater Art"
 Börje Forsberg - executive production
 Kristian Wåhlin - cover art

References

External links 

 
 Greater Art @ Encyclopaedia Metallum 
 

1994 debut albums
Lake of Tears albums